The Waterloo Declaration or Called to Full Communion is an accord reached in 2001 by the Anglican Church of Canada and the Evangelical Lutheran Church in Canada.  It was reached in 2001 at the Anglican Church's General Synod which was held at the University of Waterloo.

See also

 Anglican Communion and ecumenism
 Called to Common Mission
 Churches Beyond Borders
 Porvoo Communion

External links
Called to Full Communion at the ELCIC website.

2001 documents
Protestant ecumenism
Anglican Church of Canada
Lutheranism in Canada
Anglican ecumenism